Eritrea was a colonial ship of the Italian Regia Marina constructed in the Castellammare Shipyards near Napoli.  Construction started in 1935 and she was commissioned in 1937. She served mainly in the Indian and western Pacific Oceans.

Design

The Eritrea (2,170 tons displacement) was constructed for duties as a typical "colonial ship" and was sometimes referred to as a "sloop". She had a novel diesel-electric machinery outfit designed to maximise range.

She was armed with four 120 mm guns, two 40 mm guns, and two 13.2 mm machine guns. The ship also had an extensive engineering workshop on board and could provide repair support to Italian submarines based in East Africa.

A modified sister ship to be called Etiopia was planned, but cancelled on the outbreak of war.

Service

Following Italy's declaration of war on 10 June 1940, colonial ship Eritrea became part of the Italian Royal Navy (Regia Marina). Eritrea was part of the Italian Navy's Red Sea Flotilla located at the port of Massawa in Eritrea.

In February 1941, as the East African Campaign started to go badly for the Italians, Massawa, the home port for Eritrea became more endangered.

She sailed across the Indian Ocean and ultimately reached Kobe, Japan. Upon reaching Japan, Eritrea was supposed to operate as a commerce raider in the Pacific Ocean.  Even though allied with Italy, the authorities of then neutral Japan took a dim view of the idea of an Italian raider operating from neutral Japanese ports.  The Japanese refused to comply with the Italian plans and Eritrea was not allowed to leave Kobe.

In December 1941, after the official declaration of war, the Japanese government allowed Eritrea to provide assistance to "transport submarines."  These submarines, carrying rare goods, arrived in Japanese-held Penang and Singapore from the distant bases in German-held Bordeaux.

On 8 September 1943, when Italy declared an armistice, Eritrea was navigating between Singapore and Sabang to give a support to the Italian oceanic cargo submarine .  The submarine had just arrived from occupied France after a long and difficult voyage.  As soon as the Reuters message about the surrender of Italy was picked up by the crew of Eritrea, the vessel changed course at once and headed at full speed to Colombo in Ceylon to surrender. Eritrea passed by Sumatra and escaped despite the presence of the Japanese aerial and naval units. Off the coast of Ceylon, it was intercepted by HMS Overdale Wyke of the Ceylon Naval Volunteer Force. Eritrea identified itself and its intent to surrender. It was boarded by a party from HMS Overdale Wyke and escorted to the Port of Colombo. It was later used by the Royal Navy from Colombo and Addu Atoll.

French service

After the war, Eritrea was turned over to France. The French Navy used Eritrea in colonial service with the name Francis Garnier until 1965. Francis Garnier was then declassed to become a target ship.  She was sunk during a nuclear test in the Pacific Ocean in 1966.

See also

 East African Campaign

Notes

References

External links
 Sesuikan
 Eritrea Marina Militare website 

World War II naval ships of Italy
Ships built in Castellammare di Stabia
World War II mine warfare vessels
Naval ships of France
Military of British Ceylon
Ships sunk as targets
Maritime incidents in 1966
1936 ships